Atikameg is a settlement in Alberta, Canada.

Atikameg means little whitefish in Cree. The settlement is home to the Whitefish Lake First Nation and is the centre of the Utikoomak Lake 155 Indian Reserve. The Whitefish Lake Band is affiliated to the Kee Tas Kee Now Tribal Council.

The postal code for Atikameg is T0G 0C0.

Infrastructure 
A health care centre is operational in the community, as is a police detachment and the administration office of the Whitefish Lake Band. There is a day care, social services building and a post office. The community has both a water treatment plant and a sewage treatment plant.

The Atikameg School (K-12) serves the community with a student population of approximately 200 students. Most of the students are bused to the school from Atikameg and from Whitefish River.

Demographics 
The entire Utikoomak Lake 155 reserve had a population of 786 in 2006, a 3.2% decrease from 2001.

References 

Localities on Indian reserves in Alberta